Have a Nice Day is a 1971 studio album by Count Basie and his orchestra, with all music composed and arranged by Sammy Nestico.

This was Basie's debut recording for Daybreak.

Sammy Nestico, a graduate of Duquesne University who worked for the US Air Force Band, primarily the Airmen of Note, in Washington, DC for 12 years after World War II, had at this time been writing for Basie for four years.

On this album Basie recorded the song Scott's Place written for KFI jazz DJ Scott Ellsworth. Like all other cuts on the LP it was composed by Sammy Nestico. This later became the theme music for Ellsworth's night time radio program.

The title track of this album was also used as theme music. Radio personality J.P. McCarthy used Have a Nice Day to open his "Morning Music Hall" on WJR, a powerful Detroit AM radio station, for several years in the early to mid 1970s. McCarthy overlaid the first few bars of the song with the sound of a wind-up alarm clock, first ticking and then ringing, to greet his listeners each morning.

The album was reissued on CD in West Germany by EmArcy Records (Catalog #824 867-2) and Marketed by Phonogram. (CD itself says "Made in W. Germany by Polygram")

Track listing 
 "Have a Nice Day" – 3:14
 "The Plunger" – 3:42
 "Jamie" – 3:22
 "It's About Time" – 3:03
 "This Way" – 2:28
 "Scott's Place" – 3:53
 "Doin' Basie's Thing" – 2:48
 "The Spirit Is Willing" – 3:00
 "Small Talk" – 3:28
 "You 'N Me" – 2:55
 "Feelin' Free"" – 2:40

All music composed by Sammy Nestico.

Personnel
The Count Basie Orchestra
 Count Basie - piano
 Paul Cohen - trumpet
 Sonny Cohn
 Pete Minger
 Waymon Reed
 Al Grey - trombone
 Bill Hughes
 Grover Mitchell
 Melvin Wanzo
 John Watson, Sr.
 Bobby Plater - alto saxophone
 Curtis Peagler
 Eric Dixon - tenor saxophone
 Eddie 'Lockjaw' Davis
 J. C. Williams - baritone saxophone
 Freddie Green - guitar
 Norman Keenan - double bass
 Harold Jones - drums
 Sammy Nestico - arranger, conductor

References

1971 albums
Count Basie Orchestra albums
Albums arranged by Sammy Nestico
Polydor Records albums
Albums conducted by Sammy Nestico